Shyam Shah Medical College is among the oldest medical colleges in Madhya Pradesh state of India. It is situated in Rewa city. The college is associated with Sanjay Gandhi Memorial Hospital and Gandhi Memorial Hospital. It is named after Amar Shaheed Shri Shyam Shah Singh, a rebel of the British India Company in the mid-19th century.

Location 
The college is situated in the heart of Rewa city near Sanjay Gandhi Memorial Hospital, which is the biggest hospital of Vindhya region.

Establishment 
The college was established in the year 1963 and initially started functioning in the Model Science College, Rewa till the college's own building was inaugurated by Shri Arjun Singh, the then Chief Minister of Madhya Pradesh state on 3 October 1980.

Academics 
The college has an annual intake of 100 undergraduate candidates for MBBS (25 seats added in 2019) and 50 postgraduate candidates for MD/MS/Diplomas. The college offers following courses recognised by Medical Council of India:
MBBS
MS/MD/Diploma courses in various subjects
B.Sc. Nursing
Paramedical courses

Departments 
Anatomy
Physiology
Biochemistry
Pharmacology
Pathology
Microbiology
Forensic Medicine
Community Medicine
Ophthalmology
Otolaryngology
Medicine
Surgery
Obstetrics & Gynecology
Pediatrics
Anesthesiology
Radiology
Dermatology
Orthopedics
Psychiatry

Campus 
The campus is spread over a large area consisting of college building, medical auditorium, two huge hospitals i.e. Sanjay Gandhi memorial hospital and Gandhi memorial hospital, PG hostels, nurses hostel and doctor's residential colony. The UG hostel for boys and girls are situated near the PTS square of Rewa City. The college campus also has a badminton court, games hall and ground for various sports and recreational activities. Recently, the foundation of sculpture of Lal Shyam Shah(a freedom fighter from Vindhya region, in whose memory the college has been named) was laid in the college campus. A solar energy project has also been approved by State Ministry of New And Renewable Energy.

References

External links
 

Medical colleges in Madhya Pradesh
Rewa, Madhya Pradesh
Educational institutions established in 1963
1963 establishments in Madhya Pradesh